Blake Bodily (born January 13, 1998) is an American professional soccer player who currently plays for San Diego Loyal SC in the USL Championship.

Career
Born in Idaho to parents of Scottish origin, Bodily began his youth career with the Boise Nationals before joining the Portland Timbers Academy in 2014.  On June 29, 2015, he made his professional debut for USL club Portland Timbers 2 in a 2–0 defeat to Seattle Sounders FC 2.

In January 2020, Bodily signed a homegrown contract with Portland Timbers and forwent his senior year with Washington.

On October 1, 2021, Bodily moved on loan to USL Championship side San Diego Loyal. On October 19, 2021, Bodily was recalled by Portland.

Following the 2022 season, his contract option was declined by Portland. He return to San Diego on a permanent deal on January 24, 2023.

Honors 
Individual

 Pac-12 Conference Men's Soccer Freshman of the Year: 2017
 Pac-12 Conference Men's Soccer Player of the Year: 2019

References

External links

USSF Development Academy bio
Top Drawer Soccer bio

1998 births
Living people
All-American men's college soccer players
American soccer players
Washington Huskies men's soccer players
Homegrown Players (MLS)
Portland Timbers players
Portland Timbers 2 players
Portland Timbers U23s players
San Diego Loyal SC players
Association football midfielders
People from Eagle, Idaho
Soccer players from Idaho
USL Championship players
USL League Two players
Major League Soccer players
MLS Next Pro players